This article lists major bombings during the Iraqi Insurgency (2011–present) following the withdrawal of US troops at the end of the Iraq War.

2011

22 December 2011 Baghdad bombings

2012

5 January 2012 Iraq bombings
14 January 2012 Basra bombing
27 January 2012 Baghdad bombing
23 February 2012 Iraq attacks
20 March 2012 Iraq attacks
13 June 2012 Iraq attacks
23 July 2012 Iraq attacks
16 August 2012 Iraq attacks
9 September 2012 Iraq attacks

2013

19 March 2013 Iraq attacks
15 April 2013 Iraq attacks
18 April 2013 Baghdad bombing
May 2013 Iraq attacks
27 May 2013 Baghdad bombings
10 June 2013 Iraq attacks
16 June 2013 Iraq attacks
July 2013 Iraq attacks
2013 Camp Ashraf attack
20 September Samarra attack
21 September 2013 Iraq attacks
4 December 2013 Iraq attacks

Bombings
Insurgency